Tropisternus blatchleyi is a species of water scavenger beetle in the family Hydrophilidae. It is found in North America.

Subspecies
These two subspecies belong to the species Tropisternus blatchleyi:
 Tropisternus blatchleyi blatchleyi Orchymont, 1922
 Tropisternus blatchleyi modestus Orchymont, 1938

References

Further reading

External links

 

Hydrophilinae
Articles created by Qbugbot
Beetles described in 1922